The 2015 WNBA Playoffs was the postseason tournament of the WNBA's 2015 season.

Format
Following the WNBA regular season, four teams in each conference qualified for the playoffs and are seeded one to four based on their regular season record.

The first round of the playoffs, or Conference Semi-Finals, consisted of two match-ups in each conference based on the seedings (1-4 and 2-3). The two winners advanced to the second round, or Conference Finals, with a match-up between the 1-4 and 2-3 winners. At the conclusion of the Conference Finals, the winners of these series advanced to the WNBA Finals.

The Conference Semi-Finals and the Conference Finals are each best-of-three series. Series are played in a 1-1-1 format, meaning the team with home-court advantage (better record) hosts games 1 and 3, while their opponent hosts game 2. The WNBA Finals are a best-of-five series played in a 2-2-1 format, meaning the team with home-court advantage hosts games 1, 2, and 5 while their opponent hosts games 3 and 4.

Tiebreak procedures

Two-team tie
 Better record in head-to-head games.
 Better winning percentage within own conference.
 Better winning percentage against all teams with .500 or better record at the end of the season.
 Better point differential in games head-to-head.
 Coin toss.

Three or more-team tie
 Better winning percentage among all head-to-head games involving tied teams.
 Better winning percentage against teams within conference (for first two rounds of playoffs) or better record against teams in the opposite conference (for Finals).
 Better winning percentage against all teams with a .500 or better record at the end of the season.
 Better point differential in games involving tied teams.
 Coin toss.

Playoff qualifying

Eastern Conference

Western Conference

Playoffs and Finals

Eastern Conference
All times are in Eastern Daylight Time (UTC−4)

Conference semifinals

(1) New York Liberty vs. (4) Washington Mystics

(2) Chicago Sky vs. (3) Indiana Fever

Conference Finals: (1) New York Liberty vs. (3) Indiana Fever

Western Conference
All times are in Eastern Daylight Time (UTC−4)

Conference semifinals

(1) Minnesota Lynx vs. (4) Los Angeles Sparks

(2) Phoenix Mercury vs. (3) Tulsa Shock

Conference Finals: (1) Minnesota Lynx vs. (2) Phoenix Mercury

WNBA Finals

Minnesota Lynx vs. Indiana Fever

References

Women's National Basketball Association Playoffs